Saša Dreven (born 27 January 1990) is a Croatian football goalkeeper. Dreven is currently playing for Austrian lower league side ASKÖ Oedt.

Club career

Varaždin
Hailing from Trnovec Bartolovečki, he was a product of the NK Varteks youth academy and joined the first team in 2009 as a 19-year-old. His debut for Varteks in the Prva HNL came in a 0–0 draw on 22 November 2009 against NK Slaven Koprivnica. The team fell into financial difficulty, changed its name to NK Varaždin in mid-2010, suffered two different suspensions from play by the Croatian Football Federation; Dreven left the team, with unpaid wages, in 2012.

Tampines Rovers
He joined the Singaporean side in 2012 on a free transfer. His debut came on 12 February 2012 against DPMM FC in a 2–2 draw. At the end of the season he was released.

Return to Croatia
Dreven returned to Croatia in the summer of 2013, joining the third-tier side NK Podravina from Ludbreg, making a mark by scoring from a penalty as well. During the winter break, he made his return to Prva HNL signing a -year contract with NK Istra 1961. Following a season at Istra 1961, he moved on to a short, fruitless stint at NK Zavrč before joining lower-tier fan-run NK Varteks (unassociated with his previous Varteks club).Varteks.

Austria
He moved to Austria in 2019 to play for 5th tier-outfit Lingenau and later played for SW Bregenz on the third level.

Club statistics

As of 3 April 2013.

References

1990 births
Living people
Sportspeople from Varaždin
Association football goalkeepers
Croatian footballers
Croatia youth international footballers
NK Varaždin players
Tampines Rovers FC players
NK Istra 1961 players
NK Zavrč players
SW Bregenz players
Croatian Football League players
Second Football League (Croatia) players
Singapore Premier League players
Austrian 2. Landesliga players
Austrian Regionalliga players
Croatian expatriate footballers
Expatriate footballers in Singapore
Croatian expatriate sportspeople in Singapore
Expatriate footballers in Slovenia
Croatian expatriate sportspeople in Slovenia
Expatriate footballers in Austria
Croatian expatriate sportspeople in Austria